U.S. Route 150 (US 150) in Illinois is a  east–west highway that runs from US 6 near the Quad City International Airport in Moline to the Indiana state line near Vermilion. It closely parallels Interstate 74 (I-74) between Moline and Danville.

Route description

Moline to Peoria
Starting at US 6, US 150 starts southeastward. It then intersects IL 81 west of Lynn Center. Then, north of Alpha, IL 17 begins to follow US 150. IL 17 then leaves US 150 south of Alpha. In Galesburg, US 150 meets US 34/IL 110 (CKC) at a cloverleaf. In downtown Galesburg, US 150 turns east and then southeast. It then turns east in Knoxville. East of Knoxville, it meets IL 97 at a 3-way intersection and then I-74 at a partial cloverleaf interchange. It then meets IL 180 south of Williamsfield. Just south of where IL 78 branches off west, US 150 suddenly turns southeast. As it enters Peoria, it then meets IL 91 at a signalized intersection and then IL 6 at a partial cloverleaf. Further southeast, it meets I-74 at a modified trumpet interchange. It then meets IL 40 at a continuous-flow intersection. However, only northbound IL 40's left turn got displaced. Just before US 150 proceeds to cross the McClugage Bridge, it meets IL 29 at a parclo.

Peoria to Farmer City
After it crosses the bridge, it meets US 24 and IL 116 at a combination interchange. From there, US 24 runs concurrently with US 24 and IL 116. In East Peoria, only US 150 meets I-74 twice within the city limit. Between the two I-74 junctions, US 24 and IL 116 leave westward while IL 8 joins US 150. Just east of the incomplete interchange of I-74, IL 8 leaves northeastward. In Morton, US 150 crosses under I-74 numerous times without a direct interchange. One of them is in Morton, another south of Deer Creek, and another near Farmer City. Also, US 150 travels in an eastward direction. In Goodfield, it meets IL 117. Between Congerville and Carlock, it travels southward. North of Yuton, it meets I-74 at a diamond interchange. Then, IL 9 joins US 150 east until in downtown Bloomington. At downtown, US 150 turns southeast. It then intersects I-55 BL and then US 136. In Farmer City, it intersects IL 54.

Farmer City to Indiana state line

Continuing southeast, US 150 briefly runs concurrently with IL 47 in Mahomet. As it enters the city of Champaign, it crosses above I-57 with no direct interchange. Then, it turns east at the intersection of IL 10. Between Champaign and Urbana, US 45 follows US 150. It then runs concurrently with IL 130 at a short distance. From Ogden to near Fithian, IL 49 follows US 150. Then, near Batestown, it meets I-74 at a parclo. In Danville, US 150 and US 136 switch roads. At that point, US 150 follows IL 1 between Danville and Paris. They then meet I-74 in Tilton at a cloverleaf, and US 36 south of Chrisman. As they enter Paris, the routes become a one-way pair. At the junction where IL 16 and IL 133 ends, US 150 turns east while IL 1 keeps going south. Further east, US 150 reaches the Indiana state line.

History

Before 1936, parts of IL 16, IL 39, IL 80, IL 91, and IL 121 ran on the current routing of US 150. In 1936, US 150 extended due northwest from Shoals, Indiana, to the Quad Cities. As a result, IL 39 and IL 91 were decommissioned, and IL 16, IL 80, and IL 121 were truncated.

In 1954, a portion of US 150 in Peoria moved from the Franklin Street Bridge to the McClugage Bridge. As a result, US 150 City, later US 150 Bus., appeared in Peoria from 1954 to 1964. Meanwhile, in Champaign–Urbana, another US 150 Bus. lasted from 1960 to 1966. In 1971, the decision to remove a portion of US 150 from US 67 in Rock Island to I-74 in Danville failed. However, in 1976, the decision to truncate US 150 from US 67 in Rock Island to US 6 near the Quad City Airport was approved.

Major intersections

See also

References

External links

50-1
 Illinois